Nevermore is a 1962 Soviet drama film directed by Vladimir Dyachenko and Pyotr Todorovsky.

Plot 
At the shipyard the director was changed. The new director turned out to be an extremely cruel person.

Cast 
 Yevgeny Yevstigneyev as Alexander Aleksin, new director shipyard
 Pyotr Gorin as Fyodor Shanko
 Ninel Myshkova as Irina, wife Aleksin
 Evgeniy Grigorev as Garpischenko
 Stanislav Khitrov as Melnitsky
 E. Lavrovsky as Dolina
 Leonid Parkhomenko as Shcherbak (as L. Parkhomenko)
 Mariya Lvova as Inna (as M. Lvova)
 Valentina Vladimirova as Masha (as V. Vladimirova)
 Valeriy Nosik as Nitochkin (as V. Nosik)

References

External links 
 

1962 films
1960s Russian-language films
Soviet drama films
1962 drama films